NGC 1250 is an edge-on lenticular galaxy located about 275 million light-years away in the constellation Perseus. It was discovered by astronomer Lewis Swift on Oct 21, 1886. NGC 1250 is a member of the Perseus Cluster.

See also 
 List of NGC objects (1001–2000)
 NGC 1277

References

External links

Perseus Cluster
Perseus (constellation)
Lenticular galaxies
1250
02613
012098 
+07-07-040
Astronomical objects discovered in 1886
Discoveries by Lewis Swift